The International Suzuka 500 km, was the opening round of the 1985 All Japan Endurance Championship  was held at the Suzuka Circuit, on 7 April, in front of a crowd of approximately 23,000.

Report

Entry
A total of 30 cars were entered for the event, across four classes ranging from Modified Hatchbacks to Group C Prototypes.

Qualifying
The pairing of Kunimitsu Takahashi and Kenji Takahashi took pole position for Advan Sports Nova, in their Porsche 962C ahead of the European partnership of Geoff Lees and Eje Elgh for the Dome Motorsport Team, by just 0.07secs.

Race
The race was held over 85 laps of the Suzuka circuit, a distance of 500 km (actual distance was 502.690 km). Lees and Elgh took the winner spoils for the Dome Motorsport team, in their Dome-Toyota 84C. The pair won in a time of 3hr 35:59.060 mins., averaging a speed of 87.273 mph. Second place went to Kazuyoshi Hoshino and Akira Hagiwara in the Hoshino Racing March-Nissan 83G who were the only other finisher to complete the full race distance. One lap adrift in third was the Porsche of Kunimitsu Takahashi and Kenji Takahashi.

Classification

Class Winners are in Bold text.

References

All Japan Sports Prototype Championship
International Suzuka 500km
Suzuka